Hong Moon-jong (Korean: 홍문종; born 26 May 1955) is a South Korean politician who served as the Member of the National Assembly for Uijeongbu 2nd constituency. He also served as the Secretary-General of the Saenuri Party. He is the son of the late former politician Hong Woo-jun.

Born at Yangju, Hong studied at Harvard University. He started his political career when he entered to the Democratic Liberal Party (then New Korea Party aka NKP) in 1995. During the general election in 1996, he defeated Moon Hee-sang from the National Congress for New Politics (NCNP). In 1997, he left the NKP and joined the National Party - New (NPN) in order to endorse Lee In-je as the upcoming President. Hong stood up as a nonpartisan candidate in 2000 despite of his lost. He temporarily came back as MP after the by-election in 2003, till he lost just after a year.

After involving several controversies, Hong officially came back as MP in 2012. He was then re-elected in 2016. As one of the politicians supporting ex-President Park Geun-hye, he endorsed her as President in 2007. He unsuccessfully ran as the parliamentary leader of the Liberty Korea Party (LKP) in 2017.

In 2019, Hong announced to leave the LKP. A minor political party named the Korean Patriots' Party elected Hong as the party president along with incumbent Cho Won-jin, and the party officially changed their name as the Our Republican Party (ORP).

On 10 February 2020, Hong was sacked from the ORP after long-time conflicts with Cho. He then formed the new party named Pro-Park New Party.

References

External links 
 Hong Moon-jong in Twitter
 Hong Moon-jong in Blog

1955 births
Living people
People from Yangju
South Korean politicians
Harvard University alumni